Anatoly Shevchenko (born 21 January 1940) is a Russian handball player. He competed in the men's tournament at the 1972 Summer Olympics.

References

1940 births
Living people
Russian male handball players
Olympic handball players of the Soviet Union
Handball players at the 1972 Summer Olympics
Place of birth missing (living people)